Harold Morton Talburt (February 19, 1895 – October 24, 1966) was an American cartoonist and illustrator who received the 1933 Pulitzer Prize for Editorial Cartooning.

Early life
Talburt was born in Toledo, Ohio.

Career
Talburt started his career as a reporter with the Toledo News-Bee in 1916, and became an editorial cartoonist with the Scripps–Howard News Services in 1922. His 1932 cartoon "The Light of Asia", printed in The Washington Daily News, received the 1933 Pulitzer Prize, and his other awards included a 1956 Christopher Award and an award from the Freedoms Foundation. He was chief editorial cartoonist of Scripps–Howard years until his retirement in 1963. He was a member of the Gridiron Club of Washington, D.C. and served as its president in 1943.

Death
Talburt died of cancer at his Kenwood, Maryland, home on October 24, 1966, aged 71.

References

External links

Inventory of the H. M. Talburt Collection at Syracuse University
Inventory of the H. M. Talburt Collection at Wichita State University

1895 births
1966 deaths
American editorial cartoonists
Pulitzer Prize for Editorial Cartooning winners
Artists from Toledo, Ohio
Artists from Maryland
American comic strip cartoonists